John Eveleigh, Rector of Killane and then Precentor of Cloyne, was the Dean of Ross, Ireland from 1639 until 1664.

References

Deans of Ross, Ireland
17th-century Irish Anglican priests
Year of birth missing
Year of death missing